Citizen of the World is an album by David Arkenstone, released in 1999. It is the first in which he purposely makes a tour of world music forms, mixing them with jazz, rock, and New Age elements.

Track listing
"Forest Runners" – 5:55
"Desert Crossing" – 5:21
"Moonflower" – 5:08
"The Gypsy Camp" – 4:20
"Safe Passage" – 4:57
"Ceremony" – 6:24
"Land of the Tiger" – 6:21
"Carried Away Across the Sea" – 4:36
"Temple of the Pharaoh" – 6:06
"Into the Dreamtime" – 7:15

 All tracks composed by David Arkenstone
 Arranged by Don Markese and David Arkenstone
 Recorded and mixed by Mike Aarvold and David Arkenstone

Personnel
 David Arkenstone – keyboards, bouzouki, guitar, flutes, bass, percussion, sound design
 Don Markese – flute, alto flute, bass flute, pan flute, pennywhistle, piccolo, clarinet, soprano sax
 Sid Page, Joel Derouin – violin
 Danny Chase – drums
 Samite Mulondo – kalimba on "Safe Passage"

References

1999 albums
David Arkenstone albums
Windham Hill Records albums